Julien Émile Verbrugghe (26 December 1889 — 21 August 1916) was a French footballer who played as a forward for AS Française, Red Star and France.

Club career
In 1905, Verbrugghe began his career with AS Française. In 1910, Verbrugghe signed for Red Star, playing for the club until his death.

International career
Born in France, Verbrugghe is of Belgian descent through his father. On 1 November 1906, Verbrugghe made his debut for France in a 15–0 loss against England Amateurs. At the age of 16 years, 10 months and six days, Verbrugghe became the youngest ever French international player, a record he still holds to this day.

Death
As a result of World War I, Verbrugghe joined the 43rd Infantry Regiment of the French Army. On 21 August 1916, Verbrugghe died at Maurepas, during the Battle of the Somme.

References

1889 births
1916 deaths
Sportspeople from Roubaix
French footballers
France international footballers
French people of Belgian descent
Association football forwards
Red Star F.C. players
French Army soldiers
French military personnel killed in World War I
Footballers from Hauts-de-France